Greatest Hits/Every Mile a Memory 2003–2008 is the first greatest hits album by American country music singer Dierks Bentley. It was released May 6, 2008 via Capitol Records Nashville. His fourth album from that label, the album includes his ten singles from his first three studio albums: his 2003 self-titled debut, 2005's Modern Day Drifter, and 2006's Long Trip Alone. Two newly-recorded songs were also added to this compilation; those were "Sweet and Wild" (a duet with Sarah Buxton) and "With the Band". The CD even includes live recordings of the album cuts "So So Long" (originally on Modern Day Drifter) and "Wish It Would Break" (originally from his self-titled debut) as well as live renditions of his singles "Come a Little Closer", "Lot of Leavin' Left to Do", and "Free and Easy (Down the Road I Go)".

Bentley enlisted the help of his fans to assist in selection of the album's live tracks, title, and cover art. The first 3000 are credited as executive producers in the liner notes.

Track listing

Personnel on new and live tracks
Brett Beavers – background vocals
Jim Beavers – background vocals
Dierks Bentley – acoustic guitar, electric guitar, lead vocals
Sarah Buxton – vocals on "Sweet and Wild"
Rob Harrington – bass guitar
Rod Janzen – electric guitar, background vocals
Greg Mangum – background vocals
Steve Misamore – drums
Gary Morse – lap steel guitar
Tim Sergent – banjo, pedal steel guitar, background vocals
Bryan Sutton – banjo, acoustic guitar
Russell Terrell – background vocals
Luke Wooten – background vocals

Charts

Weekly charts

Year-end charts

References

2008 greatest hits albums
Dierks Bentley albums
Capitol Records compilation albums